Speiredonia substruens is a species of moth of the family Erebidae first described by Francis Walker in 1858. It is found in India.

External links
 

Moths described in 1858
Speiredonia